Black Velvet is a studio album by American country music artist Robin Lee, released in 1990. The album's title track is a cover of Alannah Myles' Number One single from 1989. Lee's cover peaked at No. 12 on the Billboard Hot Country Singles & Tracks chart.

Critical reception

The Washington Post panned "the selection of such bland, easy-listening ballads" and "Lee's polished but undistinguished voice." The Calgary Herald noted that Lee's "singing talent is just good enough to get her booked into better bowling alley lounges, but either she or her manager has figured the road to success is fast and easy when carbon copies of pop hits are cranked out and peddled as country."

Track listing

Musical credits
Michael Black – background vocals
Larry Byrom – electric guitar
Jim Ferguson – background vocals
Sonny Garrish – steel guitar, Dobro
Billy Hullett – electric guitar, acoustic guitar
Clayton Ivey – keyboards
Jerry Kroon – drums, percussion
Robin Lee – lead and background vocals
Gary Lunn – bass guitar
Kim Morrison – background vocals
Ron "Snake" Reynolds – percussion
Brent Rowan – electric guitar
Harry Stinson – background vocals
John Willis – acoustic guitar
Lonnie Wilson – background vocals
Dennis Wilson – background vocals

Charts

Weekly charts

Year-end charts

References

Robin Lee Bruce albums
1990 albums
Atlantic Records albums